The Vice President of the Senate of Puerto Rico (commonly known as the President pro tempore) is the second highest-ranking officer of the Senate of Puerto Rico and substitutes the President in his absence. The President pro tempore is counterparted in the House by the Speaker pro tempore of the House.

The current President pro tempore is Marially González Huertas (PPD).

Presidents pro tempore

Officers of the Senate of Puerto Rico